Osloer Straße is a Berlin U-Bahn station in the Gesundbrunnen (former Wedding) district, located on the  and . Like the eponymous street it is named after the City of Oslo.

The two-level station opened on 30 April 1976 (U9) and 5 October 1977 (U8). Since 1995 it has also been served by the M13 line and line 50 of the Berlin Straßenbahn. The architect was R. G. Rümmler.
The station have had also a direct connection to Tegel Airport with the bus 128.

References

U8 (Berlin U-Bahn) stations
U9 (Berlin U-Bahn) stations
Buildings and structures in Mitte
Railway stations in Germany opened in 1976